Dennis Guth (born 1955) is the Iowa State Senator from the 28th District. A Republican, he has served in the Iowa Senate since winning an election against Bob Jennings in 2012, flipping the seat from Democratic to Republican.

Born in Klemme, Iowa Guth attended Klemme area Community School District. After graduating, Guth went go on to attend Iowa State University where he received a degree in Agricultural Mechanization. He first became involved in politics in 1994 when he was asked to be precinct chair the Ell Township Republican Committee, going on to serve 12 years as chair before going on to seek elected office. Guth currently resides in Klemme with his wife Margaret, they have five children, one of which they had adopted from Brazil.

As of February 2020, Guth serves on the following committees: Appropriations, Labor and Business Relations, and Local Government. He also serves on the Administration and Regulation Appropriations Subcommittee (Chair), as well as the Healthy and Well Kids in Iowa (HAWK-I) Board.

Electoral history

References 

Republican Party Iowa state senators
Living people
21st-century American politicians
Iowa State University alumni
1955 births
People from Hancock County, Iowa